Erik Axel Karlfeldt (20 July 1864 – 8 April 1931) was a Swedish poet whose highly symbolist poetry masquerading as regionalism was popular and won him the 1931 Nobel Prize in Literature posthumously after he had been nominated by Nathan Söderblom, member of the Swedish Academy. Karlfeldt had been offered the award already in 1919 but refused to accept it, because of his position as permanent secretary to the Swedish Academy (1913–1931), which awards the prize.

Biography
Karlfeldt was born into a farmer's family in Karlbo, in the province of Dalarna. Initially, his name was Erik Axel Eriksson, but he assumed his new name in 1889, wanting to distance himself from his father, who had suffered the disgrace of a criminal conviction. He studied at Uppsala University, simultaneously supporting himself by teaching school in several places, including Djursholms samskola in the Stockholm suburb of Djursholm and at a school for adults. After completing his studies, he held a position at the Royal Library of Sweden, in Stockholm, for five years.

In 1904, Karlfeldt was elected a member of the Swedish Academy and held chair number 11. In 1905, he was elected a member of the Nobel Institute of the Academy, and, in 1907, of the Nobel Committee. In 1912, he was elected permanent secretary of the Academy, a position he held until his death.

Uppsala University, Karlfeldt's alma mater, awarded him the title of Doctor honoris causae in 1917.

Works in English 
Modern Swedish Poetry Part 1 (1929) – (trans. by C. D. Locock)    
Arcadia Borealis (1938) – (trans. by Charles Wharton Stork)
The North! To the North! (2001) – (trans. by Judith Moffett, five poets including Karlfeldt)

References

External links 

  
Short biography at nobel-winners.com
List of Works
Karlfeldt's collected works and a facsimile of a 1956 edition, both at Project Runeberg
 

1864 births
1931 deaths
People from Avesta Municipality
Writers from Dalarna
Members of the Swedish Academy
Nobel laureates in Literature
Swedish-language poets
Uppsala University alumni
Swedish Nobel laureates
Posthumous Nobel laureates